José Tadeo Monagas Municipality is a municipality in Guarico State, Venezuela.

Municipalities of Guárico